Kim Sang-kyung (born June 1, 1972) is a South Korean actor. He is known for his leading roles in Memories of Murder (2003) and May 18 (2007).

Two of his films directed by Hong Sang-soo, Tale of Cinema (2005) and Ha Ha Ha (2010), screened at the Cannes Film Festival. Kim has also starred in numerous television dramas, notably the period epic King Sejong the Great (2008) and the family comedy What Happens to My Family? (2014).

Filmography

Film

Television series

Theater
Mom, Do You Want to Go on a Trip? (2009)

Awards and nominations

References

External links
Kim Sang-kyung Fan Cafe at Daum 

Male actors from Seoul
South Korean male film actors
South Korean male stage actors
South Korean male television actors
Living people
1972 births
Chung-Ang University alumni
20th-century South Korean male actors
21st-century South Korean male actors